The Ohio Senate has elected members from 33 Districts since 1967.  Currently, each district consists of approximately 345,000 Ohioans.

Defunct districts
Until 1982, the 31st District existed in the eastern Cleveland metro, dating to 1967.  It was eliminated following the 1980 census, and a new district was created in central Ohio.

See also
 List of Ohio state legislatures

Representative history